Nicholas Wu Qilong (born 31 October 1970) is a Taiwanese singer and actor. He found fame in 1988 when he became a member of the popular Taiwanese band, Xiao Hu Dui (Little Tiger Team), performing alongside Alec Su and Julian Chen. The trio were extremely successful in Taiwan, selling over 15 million albums. During his time with Little Tigers Team, he pursued a solo career, releasing an extensive catalogue of songs, Mandarin and Cantonese albums as a solo artist when member Julian Chen left the group to serve compulsory military service. Wu released his debut solo album in 1992.

After the break-up of the Little Tigers Team in 1995, Wu continued his solo career and embarked on a career in acting. Since then, his career has expanded into film and television in Taiwan, Hong Kong and mainland China.

Career
In 1988, Wu was spotted by an entertainment agent, and after an audition he was chosen to be part of the 小虎隊 (Little Tigers Team) and given the nickname of "Pilihu" (霹靂虎; Thunderbolt Tiger). The group quickly became successful throughout Asia but disbanded due to one member's compulsory military service requirement. Wu continued solo, and began singing and acting in Taiwan and Hong Kong.

In five years, he released 13 Mandarin and Cantonese albums. As an actor, Wu won the 1993 Best New Artist award in Hong Kong, and the next year played the lead in the 1994 film The Lovers, his greatest commercial success. In February 1997, Wu went into the army to complete his military service. He returned to the entertainment industry in late 1998.

Just around the new millennium, with the broadcast of television series such as At the Threshold of an Era, Treasure Venture and Treasure Raiders, Wu achieved fame in the television industry. Since then, he has been working consistently in both film and television.

In February 2010, Wu and the other members of Little Tigers Team reunited to perform during the Chinese New Year. In late 2011, Wu acted in the television series Scarlet Heart, which was a huge hit in China.

Personal life
Wu is the second child in his family, with an older brother Wu Qizhan and a younger brother Wu Qilin. He married Chinese actress Ma Yashu (馬雅舒) in December 2006. They filed for divorce in 2009.

On August 5, 2009, the mainland, Taiwan, and Hong Kong media all reported that the two had signed and wanted to divorce, but there was no time to go to Yunnan to go through the formalities. The media reported that there were different opinions, but Ma Yashu was photographed by the Beijing paparazzi who was living with her foreign boyfriend. The relationship between the two should be true. According to Ma Yashu’s crew and Wu Qilong’s friends, the divorce was due to Ma Yashu’s multiple extramarital affair, and Wu Qilong couldn’t bear to file for divorce[30].

In 2011, Wu met mainland Chinese actress Liu Shishi when they co-starred in the hugely popular traversal drama Scarlet Heart. The chemistry they displayed led to rumors of a real-life romance. 

In the early morning of November 13, 2013, Wu Qilong posted a close photo with Liu Shishi on his Weibo, stating that "we cherish this hard-won relationship, officially confirming the relationship. A few minutes later, Liu Shishi also reposted this Weibo, confirming the news. On January 20, 2015, after two years of dating, Wu posted a marriage notice on Weibo. He and Liu Shishi formally registered their marriage in Beijing and obtained a marriage certificate.

The two held their wedding in Bali on March 20, 2016. 

On December 20, 2018, Liu Shishi announced that she was pregnant. On April 27, 2019, Liu gave birth to a baby boy.

Filmography

Film

Television series

Others

Discography

Studio albums

Extended plays

Compilation albums

Original soundtracks

Singles

Awards

Notes

References
 Nicky Wu at Sina 
 HKfilm

External links
 
 Snowblue's Site

1970 births
Living people
20th-century Taiwanese male actors
20th-century Taiwanese  male singers
21st-century Taiwanese  male singers
Taiwanese male television actors
Taiwanese male singers
Taiwanese Mandopop singers
Fu Jen Catholic University alumni
Cantonese-language singers of Taiwan
Male actors from New Taipei
Taiwanese television producers
Taiwanese idols
People named in the Panama Papers
Musicians from New Taipei